Fēng ("wind" 風, simplified ) is a Chinese surname of Fuxi (伏羲). Unlike the much more common Féng (冯, "gallop") surname which is pronounced with the second rising tone in Mandarin, "wind" is pronounced fēng.

In the third-century text Records of Emperors and Kings, Huangfu Mi records the legend that goddess Nüwa enfeoffed thirteen tribes or states, all having the Feng surname. 

In Min Nan the name is Hong, and commonly also as Fang.

Surname from Feng
Bo (surname) (伯)
Cheng (surname) (程)
Li Surname (郦)
Dongfang (surname) (东方)

Notable people

Stagenames
 Feng Tian (Chinese: 風田, born February 2, 1992), also known as Win Feng, is a Japanese actor, singer and model

References

Chinese-language surnames
Individual Chinese surnames